Carl Jones (born February 26, 1991) is an American professional basketball player for Soles de Ojinaga de la liga Estatal de Básquetbol de Chihuahua.

Career
In March 2014, he signed with KB Peja. In 2015, he joined Pioneros de Los Mochis of the Mexican CIBACOPA. After seven games, he left them and signed with Frayles de Guasave.
He is currently a player in the "Capitanes de Mexico" which according to Isabel, has good turnouts in every match.

References

External links
 Eurobasket.com Profile

1991 births
Living people
African-American basketball players
American expatriate basketball people in Kosovo
American expatriate basketball people in Mexico
American expatriate basketball people in North Macedonia
Barreteros de Zacatecas players
Basketball players from Ohio
Capitanes de Ciudad de México players
Frayles de Guasave players
KB Peja players
KK MZT Skopje players
Mineros de Zacatecas (basketball) players
Ostioneros de Guaymas (basketball) players
People from Garfield Heights, Ohio
Pioneros de Los Mochis players
Plateros de Fresnillo players
Point guards
Saint Joseph's Hawks men's basketball players
American men's basketball players
21st-century African-American sportspeople